Sukorady is a municipality and village in Mladá Boleslav District in the Central Bohemian Region of the Czech Republic. It has about 400 inhabitants.

Administrative parts
The village of Martinovice is an administrative part of Sukorady.

References

Villages in Mladá Boleslav District